Del Posto was a Michelin-starred fine dining Italian restaurant in the Chelsea neighborhood of Manhattan owned by Lidia, Tanya and Joe Bastianich. In the spring of 2021, after sixteen years, the space was sold to three employees.

Mario Batali was once a partner.

Reviews
In 2010, The New York Times gave them a four-star review.

References

Fine dining
Italian restaurants in New York City
Restaurants in Manhattan
Defunct restaurants in New York City
Chelsea, Manhattan